The following is a list of unproduced Shekhar Kapur projects. During his long career, Indian director Shekhar Kapur has worked on a number of projects which never progressed beyond the pre-production stage under his direction. Some of these projects fell in "development hell" or were officially canceled, some were turned over to other production teams, and still others never made it past the speculative stage.

Unrealized projects

Time Machine

In 1992, he was set to direct the Sci-fi film titled Time Machine, which was to star Aamir Khan, Raveena Tandon, Naseeruddin Shah and Rekha, but he abandoned the project halfway through due to financial problems. The film was left incomplete, although there were talks many years later that Kapur would revive the project with a new cast, which never happened.

Elizabeth's third chapter and foundation series
A third episode in the Queen Elizabeth series, Elizabeth: The Dark Age, was planned. According to screenwriter John Rogers, the success of Elizabeth led to Kapur being tapped to work on an adaptation of Isaac Asimov's Foundation Trilogy, but later both the projects got eventually shelved.

Buddha
Kapur tentatively planned to helm a motion picture account of the life of the Buddha, titled Buddha, but the plans were dropped for unstated reasons.

Larklight film adaptation
He planned to adapt Larklight, a book by Philip Reeve. Kapur traveled to Yerevan, Armenia to explore the possibility of making a film about the Armenian genocide. In an interview with Associated Content, Kapur announced he is no longer attached to Larklight.

Paani
In December 2002, Shekhar Kapur announced that his next project would be titled Paani, describing it as a "futuristic Blade Runner-type script based on India's haves and have nots". He revealed that the story would be based 60 years from the present, in a hypothetical time when water has run out, and noted that he first thought of the theme when he was making Bandit Queen (1994). A team including scriptwriter Andrew Niccol, music composer A. R. Rahman, editor Jill Bilcock and production designer John Myhre was announced for the project. In 2003, Vivek Oberoi was approached to play the lead role in the film, but the project did not materialise.

In November 2007, Kapur announced his disappointment that the film had failed to find producers and revealed that he was keen to produce it his self, if the film was made. Reports throughout the late 2000s suggested that producers including Barrie Osborne and Danny Boyle were interested in the project but no official announcement from a studio was made. Kapur later revealed concept posters of the film and held a press conference at the Marche du Film of the Cannes Film Festival in 2010, in attempt to find financiers. Later in the year, Kapur began negotiations with Yash Raj Films to be the producers and for Hrithik Roshan to be the lead actor of the film.

In November 2012, Kapur's collaboration with Yash Raj Films and producer Aditya Chopra was confirmed. Discussions with Roshan continued in late 2012 but Kapur later revealed that the script and the actor had evolved with time, and there was no longer a match between the actor and the script. Ranbir Kapoor was also considered for the film, before Sushant Singh Rajput was officially signed in September 2013. Kapur denied media reports that actresses Monica Bellucci and Anushka Sharma were approached to play the leading female role during 2013. Reports regarding the film's casting continued throughout 2014 and 2015 with actresses including Kristen Stewart, Emma Watson, Jennifer Lawrence, Kangana Ranaut, Ayesha Kapur and Rekha speculated as being a part of the cast. John Travolta also revealed that Kapur had approached him for a role in the film. The delay in the film's production had led to Rajput opting out of twelve other projects. The actor had become very involved in the making of the film, with Kapur noting that Rajput was "fully immersed in the character" and that the project had become an "addiction" for him.

By June 2015, Kapur and producer Chopra decided not to collaborate on the film owing to creative disagreements, especially on the casting of Rajput in the lead role. Rajput had also been suddenly sidelined by Chopra on other films by Yash Raj Films including Befikre (2016). Kapur suggested that he would seek international financiers as he felt producers in the Indian film industry were failing to relate to the film's core theme. The project was eventually shelved by April 2017, though the success of Baahubali: The Beginning (2017) prompted Kapur to resume his plans of making the film in late 2017, potentially with Ranveer Singh in the lead role. As of 2022, the film remains unmade, wit Kapur noting that he would dedicate the film to Rajput, who died in 2020, if it does release.

The Nine o’Clock War
One of his projects was a film tentatively titled The Nine o'Clock War. He had planned this project with his longtime friend and previous collaborator, the Australian actor Heath Ledger in the role of a popular television news anchor. It never happened, as a result of the actor's unexpected death in 2008.

Cleopatra Tv series
In 2015, He was also set to direct a series titled Cleopatra, about the famous queen Cleopatra of ancient Egypt, being developed by David Ellender's Slingshot Global Media. It was also reported that Jennifer Lawrence will star as Cleopatra Queen. The project later got shelved.

Bruce Lee biopic
It was announced that he will direct Little Dragon, an authorized biopic of martial arts legend Bruce Lee. As of 2022, there is no information regarding the project.

Abandoned projects

Joshilaay

He was originally the director of the 1989 film Joshilaay, which starred Sunny Deol, Anil Kapoor, Sridevi and Meenakshi Sheshadri before leaving the production halfway, and its producer Sibti Hassan Rizvi stepped in to complete the film.

Barsaat

In 1992, he had shot some scenes for Barsaat, which was originally titled Champion and was going to be the debut film of Bobby Deol, but he left the production and was replaced by Rajkumar Santoshi.

Dushmani

In 1995, he partly directed Dushmani, starring Sunny Deol, Jackie Shroff and Manisha Koirala before its producer Bunty Soorma stepped in to complete the film.

Roop Ki Rani Choron Ka Raja

Roop Ki Rani Choron Ka Raja was announced in 1987 with Shekhar as the director, but he subsequently left the film stating "it (film) lacked soul." He was then replaced by Satish Kaushik.

Prem

Shekhar was initially attached as a director. He convinced Tabu to stay in India and abandon her plans for her higher studies for this film but he himself never got on board with the project himself as a director. Later on Satish Kaushik directed the film.

Raja

This movie was supposed to be Shekhar's debut directorial however he did not direct this movie for unknown reasons and it was later directed by Indra Kumar. Sanjay Kapoor shared in an interview " Shekhar Kapur was initially supposed to direct Prem. But the problem with Shekhar is that he is a very lazy guy, which is why he has made such few films over 30 years. He never wanted to start it and that led to my frustration."

Superman Lives
Kapur was offered to direct Superman Lives after Tim Burton had dropped out, but he turned it down.

References

Kapur, Shekhar